The up to date is a sherry based cocktail. The drink originated in Hugo Ensslin's (creator of the Aviation cocktail) 1916 edition of Recipes for Mixed Drinks. The taste of the cocktail has been described as savory and oily, similar to that of a Manhattan.

See also
 List of cocktails

References 

 

Cocktails with fortified wine